Mónica Olivia Rodríguez Saavedra (born 14 June 1989) is a Mexican Paralympic athlete who competes in middle-distance running events at international elite competitions. She is a Parapan American Games and World champion in the 1500 metres.

In 2021, she competed at the 2020 Tokyo Paralympics, winning the gold medal in the 1500 m in a new world record of 4:37.40.

References

1989 births
Living people
People from Ciudad Guzmán, Jalisco
Paralympic athletes of Mexico
Mexican female middle-distance runners
World Para Athletics Championships winners
Medalists at the 2015 Parapan American Games
Medalists at the 2019 Parapan American Games
Athletes (track and field) at the 2016 Summer Paralympics
Athletes (track and field) at the 2020 Summer Paralympics
Medalists at the 2020 Summer Paralympics
Paralympic gold medalists for Mexico
Paralympic medalists in athletics (track and field)
Sportspeople from Jalisco